The 2010 Iowa State Cyclones football team represented Iowa State University in the 2010 NCAA Division I FBS football season. The team was led by second year head coach Paul Rhoads and played their home games at Jack Trice Stadium in Ames, Iowa. They are members of the Big 12 Conference in the North Division. They finished the season 5–7, 3–5 in Big 12 play and failed to become bowl eligible.

Recruiting

Schedule

Game summaries

Northern Illinois

The Cyclones received the opening kickoff and started strong, dominating the first half of play.  On the fifth play of the game Austen Arnaud rushed for the game's first touchdown, a 53 yd scamper around the left side, but the play was nullified due to an illegal procedure.  The Cyclones drove down to the NIU 26 where the Huskies held.  A Grant Mahoney field goal attempt was missed wide left.  The Huskies took the ball, driving to the ISU 32 where the Cyclones' Defense stiffened, creating a 4th down situation.  A field goal attempt by the Huskies was no good.  They Cyclones' taking over on downs drove on an 11 play, 68 yds, finding the endzone on a 2-yard run by QB Austen Arnaud, for the first score of the game.  The score stood 7–0 at the end of the first quarter.  The Cyclones took the ball back on a Zac Sandvig interception on the first play of the second quarter.  On the next play, Robinson raced 63 yds for his first touchdown of the night.  The extra point would make the score 14–0.  After a three and out by the Huskies the Cyclones took the ball back over on a punt at their own territory, driving to the Huskies' 23 yd line before stalling.  Grant Mahoney made a 41-yard field goal to push the Cyclone lead to 17.  The Cyclone defense held strong on the next Huskies' possession, forcing a punt.  The Cyclones took over and drove over 40 yards into Huskie territory before fumbling the ball, returning possession to the Huskies.  The Cyclone Defense again flexed its muscles holding for a three and out taking the ball over on a punt deep in their own territory.  Austen Arnaud would be picked off on the resulting drive setting up the Huskies with excellent field position right before the half.  Again, a strong Cyclone Defense stiffened holding to three plays setting up a fourth down field goal attempt for the Huskies at the ISU 16.  Coach Paul Rhoads would ice the Huskies on twice before the 33 yard attempt failed (as did the previous two attempts).  The Cyclones took a 17–0 lead into the half.

The Huskies came out of the locker room ready, driving 67 yds on the opening drive of the second half in 10 plays down to the ISU 2 yard line.  On the next three plays the Cyclone Defense held firm, not giving up a single yard forcing the Huskies to attempt a field goal.  The chip shot was good cutting into the Iowa State lead, 17–3.  ISU and NIU would exchange interceptions, each deep inside the opponents' territory to close out the third quarter.  The Cyclones entered the fourth with the ball but the drive stalled forcing the only punt of the evening for the Cyclones, an 18 yarder, giving the ball back to the Huskies at the ISU 40.  The Huskies would finally capitalize on the excellent field position, capping off a 9 play 40 yd drive with a touchdown to cut the lead to 17–10 early in the fourth quarter.  With the lead shrinking the Cyclones needed a score after being held without points since the 8:30 mark in the 2nd Quarter, and they responded.  The Cyclones offense drove down the field capping off a 73 yd drive on 10 plays with a 5 yd run by Robinson for his second touchdown of the game.  The extra point pushed the lead to 24–10.  With time running out, the Huskies took over at their own twenty following the touchback, and on the second play of the possession threw an interception to ISU's Jake Knott and returned it to the NIU 13.  The Cyclones pushed the ball forward to the 5 yd line facing a 4th and 2 situation.  The Cyclones called on Mahoney, nailing a 23 yd field goal attempt making the score 27–10.  A three and out by the Huskies gave the ball back to the Cyclones, and ISU ran out the clock.

Iowa

The Iowa Hawkeyes and the Iowa State Cyclones last met in the previous season, with Iowa winning 35–3. Iowa leads the all-time series 38–19.  The winner will receive the Cy-Hawk Trophy.

Kansas State

The Kansas State Wildcats and the Iowa State Cyclones last met up in Arrowhead Stadium in Kansas City, Missouri.  A back and forth game eventually ended up the Cyclones having the last chance for victory but fell short with the final score 27–20 Kansas State.

Northern Iowa

The Northern Iowa Panthers marked the fourth game on the Cyclones schedule. The Cyclones started slow, having a three and out to the Panther defense. Well the Panthers took over and moved the ball down field, a turnover would give the ball back to the Cyclones. The Cyclones in turn would take it down into Panther territory before settling for a field goal. But the Cyclones never looked back. The Cyclones took a 13–0 lead into the half and two "pick 6's" in the third quarter would put the game out of reach for they Panthers. While the Panthers moved the ball quite well, the Cyclone's defense stiffened when it needed to, forcing five Panther turnovers. The Cyclones shut out the Panthers 27–0, marking the first shutout victory since a 23–0 victory over the same UNI Panthers in 2004.

Texas Tech

The Red Raiders came into Jack Trice Stadium holding a 2–1 record with the lone loss coming in conference play.  The game appeared it would be a struggle early, with each defense shutting down the opposing offense. That quickly changed as the Cyclones motored out to a 24–0 lead with all points scored in the first 12 minutes of the second quarter.  Tech showed fight right before half driving down field quickly to score their first TD with 0:45 seconds left.  They Cyclones were held on their next three plays from scrimmage faced a punting situation, the snap went over the head of the punter and would be turned over to the Red Raiders.  The Red Raiders' second TD would come two plays later cutting the Cyclone lead to 24–14 at half.  Tech came out of the half fired up and quickly tied the game at 24 a piece with five minutes remaining in the 3rd.  The Cyclones responded driving down field in five plays to score their 4th TD.  A Tech fumble on the ensuing drive set up good field position for the Cyclones.  They only needed one play, a 60 yd scamper to the endzone to take a two TD lead.  Tech would cut the score to one possession at 38–31.  The next possession for the Cyclones would be drawn out for a long six minutes as time wound down in the 4th quarter.  A short TD pass would put the Cyclones up 45–31.  With a little under four minutes left in the game Tech would drive the field in about two minutes and cut the lead back down to seven.  With only a minute and a half remaining on the clock, Tech was forced to onside.  On the ensuing kickoff, Jeremy Reeves would corral the ball and see daylight, scampering down the left sideline for an inexplicable Iowa State touchdown, Their First on a Kickoff return since 1994, and only the second ever in Jack Trice Stadium History.  This would be the final dagger.  Iowa State would win 52–38.  This would end up being the most points scored in a game by the Cyclones in more than a decade... most in a conference game since the 1970s.  The win puts the overall series record at 2–6.

Utah

The first of three ranked foe faced the Cyclones in a brutal upcoming schedule.  The #10 Utah Utes came to Jack Trice Stadium having never beaten Iowa State.  After a competitive first quarter of the game with each team trading off scoring drives, the game quickly got out of hand for Iowa State.  The Cyclones took a 14–10 lead into the second quarter.  That's when the Utes would begin scoring at will, collecting 31 unanswered points in the 2nd quarter alone.  Utah lead at the half 41–14.  Utah picked up right where they left off kicking another field goal before Iowa State could get to the board again.  After the 3rd the score stood at 58–20.  The Utes picked up their first victory ever against the Cyclones as they closed out the game with an impressive 68–27 final.

Oklahoma

Texas

Source: ESPN
    
    
    
    
    
    
    
    

The Cyclones picked up their first victory ever against the Texas Longhorns.  This also marks the first time a game crowd of over 100,000 people watched a Cyclone victory.

Kansas

The Cyclones came out in the first half flat, only giving up a fumble and two 'three and outs' on three possessions in the first quarter.  The Jayhawks took a 6–0 lead on field goals to close out the first.  The only bright spot for the Cyclones in the first half came from Josh Lenz in the second quarter as he returned a punt for touchdown.  Kansas led 9–7 at the half with a last second field goal to close the half.

From there on, the Cyclones took over, rattling off 21 unanswered points in the 3rd quarter to take a commanding lead.  A Kansas score with 10 seconds left in the 4th quarter cut the score to 28–16 in the Cyclone's victory.  This was the first Cyclone win against the Jayhawks since a 13–7 win in Ames in 2004.

Nebraska

This game marks the last regularly scheduled game of a 105-year-old rivalry between the Cyclones and Cornhuskers.  Nebraska will join the Big Ten in 2011. The game ended when ISU failed to convert a fake extra point in OT to win the game.

Colorado

Missouri

Roster

Coaching staff
Paul Rhoads was hired on December 20, 2008 to be Iowa State's new head coach. His contract was reported to be a 5-year deal worth $5.75 million.

Head Coach: Paul Rhoads (Missouri Western '89)
Offensive Coordinator/Qutarterbacks: Tom Herman (California Lutheran '97)
Defensive Coordinator/Linebackers: Wally Burnham (Samford '63) 
Assistant Head Coach / Offensive Line: Bill Bleil (Northwestern College [IA] '82
Wide Receivers: Luke Wells (Oklahoma '01)
Tight Ends: Courtney Messingham (Northern Iowa '90)
Defensive Tackles: Shane Burnham (South Carolina '98)
Defensive Line: Curtis Bray (Pittsburgh '92)
Secondary/Recruiting Coordinator: Bobby Elliott (Iowa '75)
Running Backs: Kenith Pope (Oklahoma '76)
Director of Strength and Conditioning: Yancy McKnight (Missouri Southern State '01)
Assistant Strength and Conditioning Coach: Clayton Oyster (Otterbein [OH] '02)
Director of Operations: Brian Schwartze (Central Methodist University '95)
Assistant Director of Football Operations: Markus Alleyne (Concordia University [Canada] '07)
Assistant Recruiting Coordinator: Ryan McKim (Iowa State '08)
Offensive Graduate Assistant: Thomas Howe
Defensive Graduate Assistant: Nick Caley
Offensive Quality Control Graduate Assistant: Ryan Belsher
Defensive Quality Control Graduate Assistant: Ben Barkema 
Strength and Conditioning Graduate Assistant: James Harris

After the season

Awards

Big 12 Player of the week

References

Iowa State
Iowa State Cyclones football seasons
Iowa State Cyclones football